Bláfjallavegur ("Bláfjöll Road"), designated as Route 417, is a national road located in the Capital Region of Iceland. It runs from Route 1 near Sandskeið, through the nature preserve of Bláfjallafólkvangur  up to Route 42 at Hafnarfjörður.

References

Roads in Iceland